Eliza Grigg (born 9 October 1996) is a New Zealand alpine ski racer from Hororata, Canterbury.

Early life 
Grigg grew up on a farm in Canterbury, New Zealand. She started skiing aged 22 months, and joined Team Hutt aged eight. She attended St. Andrew's College, Christchurch.

Career 
From 2013 Grigg has trained with Coberger Academy at Coronet Peak. She is a member of the New Zealand Ski Women's C Team, competing in the giant slalom, slalom, super combined, and super-g events. In 2017 she was part of the New Zealand team at the 2017 Alpine World Junior Championship in Sweden.

References

New Zealand female alpine skiers
Living people
1996 births
People educated at St Andrew's College, Christchurch
People from North Canterbury
Sportspeople from Canterbury, New Zealand